Codringtonia gittenbergeri is a species of air-breathing land snail, a terrestrial pulmonate gastropod mollusc in the family Helicidae, the typical snails.

Geographic distribution
C. gittenbergeri is endemic to Greece, where it occurs in the central part of the country and in southern Peloponnese.

References

External links

Codringtonia
Endemic fauna of Greece
Molluscs of Europe
Gastropods described in 2005